This is the complete list of Olympic medalists in Nordic combined.

Men’s events

10 km individual normal hill
Known as the 18 km/ 15 km Individual Gundersen from 1924 to 2006, this event involved two jumps from the ski jumping normal hill. Since 2006, any one point difference between competitors in the ski jump represents 4 seconds between them at the start of the cross-country part of the competition. For the 2010 Winter Olympics in Vancouver, the event has been changed to only one jump from the ski jumping normal hill followed by 10 km of cross country skiing using the Gundersen system. Point-time differentials for previous Olympics are as follows: 1988–1992 – 1 pt = 6.7 seconds, 1994 – 1 pt = 6.5 seconds, 1998 – 1 pt = 6 seconds, 2002 – 1 pt = 5 seconds.

Medals:

The 10 km individual normal hill is one of ten events that has been in every Winter Olympic Games.

10 km individual large hill
Formerly known as the 7.5 km sprint, it consisted of only one jump from the large hill followined by 7.5 km of cross country skiing using the Gundersen system. Starting at the 2010 Winter Olympics, the cross country distance will be lengthened to 10 km. It follows the same point-time differential as the 10 km individual normal hill event.

Medals:

4 x 5 km team (3 x 10 km: 1988–94)
This involves each team taking one jump from the ski jumping large hill. For each one point difference between teams at the ski jump, there are 1.33 seconds between them at the start of the cross country skiing part of the competition. Point-time differentials for previous Olympics are as follows: 1988–1994 – 1 pt = 5 seconds, 1998 – 1 pt = 3 seconds, 2002 – 1 pt = 1.5 seconds, 2006 – 1 pt = 1 second.

Medals:

Statistics

Athlete medal leaders 
Four or more Olympic medals in Nordic combined:

Medals per year

Medal sweep events
These are events in which athletes from one NOC won all three medals.

  In addition to sweeping the podium, the country also had the fourth-place finisher.

See also
 List of FIS Nordic World Ski Championships medalists in Nordic combined

References
 International Olympic Committee results database

Nordic combined
Medalists in Nordic combined